Rhodopaea (or Gruevia) is a genus of leaf beetles in the subfamily Eumolpinae. It originally contained only one species, Rhodopaea angelovi, which is paleoendemic to the western Rhodopes of Bulgaria. In 2019, a second species, Rhodopaea heinzi, was described from northwestern Anatolia in Turkey.

Taxonomy
The genus Rhodopaea and the type species, R. angelovi, were originally described by Bulgarian entomologists Blagoy Gruev and Vassil Tomov in 1968. In 1974, Warchałowski suggested the generic name Gruevia, believing the name Rhodopaea to be preoccupied by a butterfly genus of the same name described by Achille Guenée in 1845. The name of the type species would therefore be Gruevia angelovi. However, it turned out the genus described by Guenée was actually called Rhodophaea, which was misspelled as Rhodopaea by Bytinski-Salz in 1938. Therefore, Rhodopaea angelovi remains the valid name for the type species.

Species
 Rhodopaea angelovi Gruev & Tomov, 1968
 Rhodopaea heinzi Kippenberg, 2019

References

Eumolpinae
Chrysomelidae genera
Beetles of Europe